The Isaac Nettles Gravestones are four unusual headstones in the Mount Nebo Baptist Church Cemetery near Carlton in rural Clarke County, Alabama. Surveyed for the National Register of Historic Places' Clarke County Multiple Property Submission, they were added to the register on February 24, 2000.

History 
Mount Nebo Baptist Church, a traditionally African American Baptist church, was established in the 19th-century. The four Nettles markers are made of concrete and feature death masks, presumed by scholars to be of the people whose graves they mark. The gravestone of note are of Angel Ezella Nettles (dates unknown), Selena (sometimes spelled Celina) Nettles (1800s–January 1940), Korean (sometimes spelled Cora) Nettles (January 1859–July 6, 1933), and Manul Burell (?–August 9, 1946). The marker for Selena Nettles was greatly damaged in 1979 during Hurricane Frederic, and what once displayed her upper torso, is now only a gravestone base.

They are attributed to Isaac "Ike" Nettles, a local man who created them between 1933 and 1946. When surveyed in 2000 the markers had not weathered well, with only the most ornate one, with three individual masks on one marker, in good condition.

References

External links

National Register of Historic Places in Clarke County, Alabama
Cemetery art
National Register of Historic Places in Alabama
African-American cemeteries